is a female Japanese politician, national university president and a researcher of economics. Her academic specialties are national public finance and economic policy.  She is a noted lecturer of public finance and is a senior professor at the National Graduate Institute for Policy Studies(GRIPS) in Tokyo.

Ōta served as the Japanese cabinet minister of economic policy, which is responsible for charging economic policy and public finance. In April 2014, Ōta has been appointed to the position of chairwoman of the board by Mizuho Financial Group, Japan's second-largest financial services group.

On 1st September 2022, following the return of the previous President, Akihiko Tanaka, to the Japan International Cooperation Agency (JICA), she was appointed as President of the National Graduate Institute for Policy Studies

Career
 1976: graduates from Hitotsubashi University
 1993: assistant professor at Osaka University
 1996: professor of economics at the National Graduate Institute for Policy Studies, (GRIPS) in Tokyo
 2002: cabinet office counsellor
 2006–2008: appointed to be Minister of State for Economic and Fiscal Policy under the Abe administration and proceeding Fukuda administration
 2008: returns to GRIPS as a professor
 2009–2011: GRIPS vice president
 2022-: GRIPS President

References

External links
 Profile from Prime Minister of Japan official website

21st-century Japanese women politicians
1954 births
Living people
People from Kagoshima
Hitotsubashi University alumni
Japanese women economists
Women government ministers of Japan
Academic staff of National Graduate Institute for Policy Studies